Richard Krawiec is an American writer. He was born in 1952 in Brockton, MA, and currently lives in North Carolina with his two sons. His most famous work is Time Sharing (1986). This novel was featured in  Publishers Weekly 'Recommended List', the Village Voice 'Real Life Rock Top Ten column, and received attention from Jonathan Yardley in The Washington Post, Richard Eder in the Los Angeles Times, and in the 'In Short' column of the 'N.Y. Sunday Times', although it got a mixed review from Michiko Kakutani in The New York Times.

Career
Krawiec published a second novel, Faith In What? and the short story collection And Fools of God. These books were reviewed by  "Publishers Weekly", "Kirkus", and "Library Journal". He is editor of two anthologies of North Carolina authors, "Cardinal" and "Voices From  Home", which included authors like Allan Gurganus, Reynolds Price, Lee Smith, Fred Chappell, and Elizabeth Spencer. He has written two sports biographies for young people, one about basketball star Yao Ming and the other about Olympic Gold Medal winning skater Sarah Hughes.  His biography of Yao Ming was cited as one of the "Forty Best Books of the Year" in 2004 by the Pennsylvania Librarians Association.

His first chapbook of poetry, "Breakdown" was published in March, 2008 by Main Street Rag Press.  His second book of poetry, "She Hands Me the Razor" was published in 2012 by Press 53. He has had 4 plays published by Big Dog Publishing.

His feature articles for "Pittsburgh" magazine won national and regional awards.  His column "Under the Radar" runs monthly in the Raleigh News and Observer.  It features discussions of literary and small presses.  Krawiec also wrote the Beginning and Intermediate Fiction Writing curriculum for the UNC-Chapel Hill  Independent Studies Program, where he teaches online writing classes. He is the 2009 recipient of the Excellence in Teaching Award from UNC-Chapel Hill for these courses.

Krawiec has won a Creative Writing Fellowship from the National Endowment for the Arts, two fellowships from the NC Arts Council, and one from the Pennsylvania Council on the Arts.

Krawiec is also the founder of Jacar Press, a Community Active Press that publishes poetry and contributes proceeds to fund workshops in underserved areas.

In addition to writing, he was one of the first writers to teach writing in homeless shelters, prisons, literacy classes, housing projects and in other community locations.  His anthology of writing from homeless shelters, "In Our Own Words" was the first published work to feature writing by people who were homeless.  His play, "Here, There, or in the Air' was co-written with the women on Death Row in Raleigh, NC.

In an interview with Robert D. Wilson of the E-journal Simply Haiku, Krawiec said: "Many of my friends lived in the projects. So I grew up hanging around with people who were primarily excluded... I found myself telling the stories of those who were ‘voiceless’."

Works

Novels
Time Sharing, (1986)
Faith In What?, (1996)

Short story collections
Cardinal, (editor) 
Voices From  Home, (editor)
And Fools of God

Poetry collections
She Hands Me the Razor, (2012)
Breakdown, (2008)

Plays
Aieee!, (2005)
Battlefield, (2005)
Here, There, Or In The Air, (2005)
If You Really Loved Me, (2007)

Footnotes

External links 
 Richard Krawiec Homepage
 Jacar Press Homepage 
 Hard Frost by Richard Krawiec in The Blue Moon Review
 And Fools of God: Richard Krawiec
 Featured Artist: Richard Krawiec N.C. Arts Council - Artist Page
 BREAKDOWN: A Father's Journey by Richard Krawiec
 BOOKS OF THE TIMES; PENNY ANTE LIVES
 Richard Krawiec responds to the foofaraw regarding Gordon Lish‘s editing of Raymond Carver, making the case for a strong-willed editor
 Directory of Writers » Richard Krawiec
 Here there or in the air by Richard Krawiec

1952 births
Living people
20th-century American novelists
American male novelists
English-language haiku poets
American columnists
Writers from Raleigh, North Carolina
20th-century American poets
American male poets
20th-century American male writers
Novelists from North Carolina
20th-century American non-fiction writers
American male non-fiction writers